Codorus Creek is a  tributary of the Susquehanna River in York County, Pennsylvania in the United States.

Course

Efforts are underway to create the Codorus Creek water trail. Trails are planned for the main branch from Indian Rock to near the confluence with the Susquehanna and the South and West branches.

Bridges
Bridge 182+42 and Bridge 634 built by the Northern Central Railway cross Codorus Creek in Shrewsbury Township.

South Branch Codorus Creek

The tributary East Branch Codorus Creek is impounded to create Lake Williams and Lake Redman, part of the water supply system for the city of York.

The tributary Centerville Creek enters the South Branch above Glen Rock.

The South Road Bridge, Northern Central Railway crosses the South Branch Codorus Creek in Springfield Township, Pennsylvania.

Watershed association
The Codorus Creek Watershed Association (CCWA) is a non-profit, all volunteer watershed organization dedicated to preserving and restoring the entire Codorus Creek watershed for today's generation and for generations to come. CCWA is actively (2011) involved in restoration activities at local tributary called Oil Creek near Hanover, and was recently awarded grant funding for another local tributary, Barshinger Creek, near Red Lion. Additional grants are pending final approval (April 2011) for two additional locations in the watershed.

See also
List of rivers of Pennsylvania

References

External links
Codorus Creek Watershed Association
U.S. Geological Survey: PA stream gaging stations

Rivers of Pennsylvania
Tributaries of the Susquehanna River
Rivers of York County, Pennsylvania